The Infidel is an album released in 1991 by Doubting Thomas, two-thirds of the members of the group Skinny Puppy. The project has been called "music for imaginary films". It was originally released in 1991 by Wax Trax! Records (bought 1992/93 by TVT Records), but has since gone out-of-print. It was re-released in 2007 by cEvin Key's Subconscious label, as a "20th anniversary edition" packaged with their Father Don't Cry EP and other bonus tracks.

Track listing

Personnel

Doubting Thomas
 cEvin Key – synthesizer, programming, drums, percussion, guitar, vocals, sampling, radio, machinery, TV, tapes, bass, production, engineering, mixing, digital editing, reconstruction on SSL Screensound
 D.R. Goettel – synthesizer, sampling, programming, TV, tapes, piano, sound source simulator, bass, production, engineering, mixing

Additional musicians
 Naomi McCleod – vocals on "I.D.L."

Technical personnel
 Dave Ogilvie – production, engineering, mixing
 Brian Gardner – mastering
 Tom Ellard – co-engineering on "The Run" and "Come in Piece"
 Brian Shanley – original sleeve design
 Simon Paul – special edition sleeve design
 Anthony Valcic – additional editing on "Father Don't Cry (Ext.)"
 Brad Vance – digital transfer, analogue mastering
 Marc Raemar – digital editing, reconstruction on SSL Screensound

References

Doubting Thomas (band) albums
1991 albums